Tanjung Batu (Cape Batu, literally "Cape Rock" in Indonesian and Malaysian) may refer to:

Tanjung Batu beach, Ketapang, Indonesia
Tanjung Batu beach, Pemangkat, Indonesia
Kampong (village) Tanjung Batu, Muara, Brunei
Tanjung Batu, a subdistrict of South Sumatra
Tanjung Batu, Kundur, the main city on Kundur Island, Riau Islands Province, Indonesia
Tanjung Batu, Bintulu, the coastal area of fourth main city Bintulu in Sarawak, Malaysia.